The East Germany men's national handball team represented the former country of East Germany in international team handball competitions. They had eight appearances at the World Men's Handball Championships, where they won silver medals in 1970 and 1974, and bronze medals in 1978 and 1986. East Germany won Olympic gold in 1980 after a thrilling final against the USSR.
The 1958 World Men's Handball Championship was the third team handball World Championship. It was held in the German Democratic Republic between 27 February and 8 March 1958.The 1974 World Men's Handball Championship was the eighth team handball World Championship. It was held in East Germany between 26 February-10 March 1974.
On 30 July 1980, the team won the olympic tournament by defeating the Soviet Union, 23–22, in the final game in Moscow.

Olympic Games history 
 1972 : 4th place
 1980 :  Champions
 1988 : 7th place

World Championship history 

 1964 : 10th place
 1967 : 9th place
 1970 :  2nd place
 1974 :  2nd place
 1978 :  3rd place
 1982 : 6th place
 1986 :  3rd place
 1990 : 8th place

References

External links

Former national handball teams
Men's national team
Handball